Phi Gamma Nu is a business fraternity in the United States. Currently, Phi Gamma Nu has 18 active collegiate chapters nationwide.

History
The original founders were:

Phi Gamma Nu was established as a sorority for women pursuing studies in business.  The sorority spent the next fifty years operating in much the same way, but the dynamics of the organization changed to a co-ed format in 1974 due to the Title IX act. While Phi Gamma Nu began accepting male members in 1974, it was not until 1981 that the National Chapter Congress changed the name of Phi Gamma Nu Sorority to Phi Gamma Nu Fraternity to comply with Title IX.

See also
 Professional fraternities and sororities
 PFA

References 

Student organizations established in 1924
Professional fraternities and sororities in the United States
Business organizations based in the United States
Professional Fraternity Association
1924 establishments in Illinois